Bone morphogenetic protein receptors are serine-threonine kinase receptors. Transforming growth factor beta family proteins bind to these receptors. There are four bone morphogenetic protein receptors:

 Bone morphogenetic protein receptor, type 1:
 ACVR1
BMPR1A
 BMPR1B
 Bone morphogenetic protein receptor, type 2

Structure 
Both type 1 and 2 bone morphogenetic protein receptors have a single transmembrane segment. Additionally, both types have a cysteine-rich extracellular domain and a cytoplasmic serine threonine kinase domain. Type 1 contains a glycine-serine-rich domain to be phosphorylated by type 2 kinase domain, initiating the signaling transduction pathway of the SMAD signaling cascade. The wrist epitope motif on BMP-2 has a high-affinity binding site for BMPR-IA. The knuckle epitope motif on BMP-2 has a low-affinity binding site for BMPR-II.

See also 
 Bone morphogenetic protein

References

External links 
 

Bone morphogenetic protein
EC 2.7.11